Immaculate Irumba Komuhangi (born c. 1977), commonly known as Immaculate Irumba, is a Ugandan banker and corporate executive, who works as the chief operating officer (COO) of Cairo Bank Uganda, a commercial bank in the country. Prior to that, she was the senior projects manager at Housing Finance Bank, another commercial bank.

Background and education
Komuhangi is a Ugandan national. She attended local primary and secondary schools, before being admitted to Makerere University, Uganda's largest and oldest public university. She graduated with a Bachelor of Arts in Social Sciences degree from there, in 2000. Her second degree, a Masters of Arts in Economic Policy and Planning, was also awarded by Makerere University. She also holds a Postgraduate Diploma in Financial Management, obtained from the Uganda Management Institute, in Kampala, Uganda's capital city. She holds ITIL certification and is a qualified Project Management Professional (PMP).

Career
As of June 2021, Komuhangi's banking career stretched back over 17 years. Her expertise spans bank operations, retail banking and business technology. Starting out as a branch manager with Stanbic Bank Uganda Limited, where she spent five years, she was hired by Housing Finance Bank (HFB), Uganda's largest mortgage lender. She spent a total of ten years there. At HFB, she led the bank's "digital transformation" process. In 2019, she left HFB and joined Cairo Bank Uganda, where she heads the bank's operations department. She is a member of the senior management team at Cairo Bank Uganda.

Personal
She is a married mother of three children.

Other considerations
Komuhangi is a member of the Project Management Institute and of the Institute of Corporate Governance of Uganda, two corporate entities in he country.

See also
 Sylvia Jagwe Owachi
 Hope Ekudu
 Suzan Mweheire Kitariko

References

External links
 Website of Cairo Bank Uganda
 Profile at Projectmangement.com
 Cairo Bank Uganda Celebrates International Women's Day As of 9 March 2022.
  Cairo Bank Donates PPE Worth Shs100m To Save Health Workers From COVID-19 As of 16 September 2020.

1970s births
Living people
Ugandan bankers
Ugandan women business executives
21st-century Ugandan businesswomen
21st-century Ugandan businesspeople
Makerere University alumni
Uganda Management Institute alumni